Thad William Allen (born 16 January 1949) is a former admiral of the United States Coast Guard who served as the 23rd commandant from 2006 to 2010. Allen is best known for his widely praised performance directing the federal response to hurricanes Katrina and Rita in the Gulf Coast region from September 2005 to January 2006, and for his role as National Incident Commander of the Unified Command for the Deepwater Horizon oil spill in the Gulf of Mexico in 2010. Robert J. Papp Jr. succeeded him as Commandant on 25 May 2010.

Allen remained on active duty for 36 days after being succeeded as commandant while serving as Deepwater Horizon National Incident Commander. He officially retired from the U.S. Coast Guard on 30 June 2010, but continued to serve as National Incident Commander for an additional three months. He has worked as an Executive Vice President at Booz Allen Hamilton since November 2011.

Early life and education
Allen was born in Los Angeles, California, the son of retired U.S. Coast Guard chief damage controlman and World War II veteran Clyde and Mrs. Wilma Allen. Allen is a 1967 graduate of Palo Verde High School in Tucson.  His family moved frequently during his childhood with his father's assignments. He attended the United States Coast Guard Academy in New London, Connecticut, where he was a standout football player, graduating in 1971. He holds a Master of Public Administration degree from George Washington University and a Master's degree in Management (S.M.) from the MIT Sloan School of Management as a Sloan Fellow.

Career

United States Coast Guard
In his four decades of service, Allen has held operational command both at sea and ashore, conducting missions to support the maritime safety, security and environmental stewardship interests of the nation. Allen was the last commanding officer of LORAN Station Lampang, Thailand, serving there from 1974 to 1975.  Station Lampang was part of the LORAN chain first put into use in 1966 as part of "Operation Tight Reign" in support of military operations in the Vietnam War. He served aboard USCGC Androscoggin (WHEC-68), and USCGC Gallatin (WHEC-721) and commanded USCGC Citrus (WLB-300). He performed dual roles as commanding officer of Group Long Island Sound and Captain of the Port, and he commanded Group Atlantic City. He also commanded the Seventh Coast Guard District in Miami and the Atlantic Area in Portsmouth, Virginia.

Flag officer

Allen's first assignment as a flag officer was as Director of Resources at Coast Guard Headquarters then Commander, Seventh Coast Guard District, where he directed all operations in the Southeastern United States and Caribbean. Following that assignment he served as Commander, Atlantic Area and U.S. Maritime Defense Zone Atlantic.  In this capacity he oversaw all Coast Guard operations on the U.S. East Coast, Gulf Coast, and Great Lakes in the aftermath of the September 11 attacks. Allen served as the U.S. Coast Guard's Chief of Staff from May 2002 until May 2006.  As Chief of Staff, Allen was third in the Coast Guard's command structure, and was commanding officer of Coast Guard Headquarters in Washington, D.C.

Hurricane Katrina
On 5 September 2005, while serving as Coast Guard Chief of Staff, Allen was appointed deputy to Federal Emergency Management Agency Director Michael D. Brown by Homeland Security Secretary Michael Chertoff, and placed in charge of Hurricane Katrina search-and-rescue and recovery efforts.  Former colleagues interviewed after the announcement praised Allen as well-suited to the task.

On 9 September 2005,  Allen was given full command of the Bush administration's Hurricane Katrina onsite relief efforts.  Secretary of Homeland Security Michael Chertoff elevated Allen following the removal of Federal Emergency Management Agency Director Michael D. Brown from that position. Allen announced on 25 January that he would be relieved of this responsibility on 27 January 2006.

Commandant of the U.S. Coast Guard
Allen assumed the duties of the 23rd Commandant of the U.S. Coast Guard on 25 May 2006.  He was appointed to a four-year term by President George W. Bush and confirmed by the Senate.  Admiral Robert J. Papp, Jr. succeeded him as Commandant on 25 May 2010, in a change of command ceremony.

Deepwater Horizon oil spill
On 30 April 2010, Homeland Security Secretary Janet Napolitano announced that Allen would serve as the National Incident Commander for the federal government's response to the Deepwater Horizon oil spill in the Gulf of Mexico.  After the end of his service as Commandant on 25 May 2010, Allen continued serving as National Incident Commander until 1 October 2010, when that billet was disestablished. He also remained on active duty in the Coast Guard until June 30, 2010, which was the first time in history the Coast Guard had two active duty four-star admirals. The position of Vice Commandant of the Coast Guard has since been made a four-star rank.

His official U.S. Coast Guard portrait, painted by artist Michele Rushworth was unveiled at Fort Lesley J. McNair upon his retirement. Allen is a member of the Coast Guard Academy Board of Trustees. He was also the director of the bureaucratic transition of the Coast Guard from the Department of Transportation to the Department of Homeland Security.

RAND Corporation and Booz Allen Hamilton
In October 2010, Allen joined the RAND Corporation as a senior fellow. On 28 November 2011, Booz Allen Hamilton named Allen a Senior Vice President, joining the firm's Justice and Homeland Security business and leading development of thought leadership and client engagement regarding the direction of law enforcement and homeland security.

Personal life
Allen resides in Vienna, Virginia, with his wife Pamela A. Hess, whom he married in October 1975. They have three children and five grandchildren. He was elected a National Academy of Public Administration Fellow in 2003.

Allen's civilian awards include the 2006 Strategic Vision Award by the Global Strategy Institute (GSI) of the Center for Strategic and International Studies (CSIS). In 2009, he was awarded the Admiral Of The Ocean Sea Award (AOTOS) from the United Seaman's Service and the 2009 Business Achievement Award given by Beta Gamma Sigma, the academic honor society affiliated with the Association to Advance Collegiate Schools of Business. He was nominated for this award by the United States Coast Guard Academy. Allen, in May 2013, also received an honorary doctorate in public service from the George Washington University.

Allen is a member of the Homeland Security Advisory Council.

Awards and decorations

Citations

References used

 Portions of this biography were taken from the Coast Guard's official biography https://www.history.uscg.mil/Browse-by-Topic/Notable-People/All/Article/1762857/admiral-thad-w-allen/

External links

 
 Harvard Business Review Podcast: Leading Through a Major Crisis
 new unified command, Cdr.: ADM (Ret.) Thad Allen
 Coast Guard chief takes over relief effort, CNN, 9 September 2005
 Thad Allen to lead Katrina recovery effort, Marine Log.com 9 September 2005
 President Bush announces his intention to nominate Vice Admiral Thad W. Allen to be the next Commandant of the Coast Guard, White House press release, 9 January 2006
 
 
 

1949 births
Booz Allen Hamilton people
Commandants of the United States Coast Guard
Fellows of the United States National Academy of Public Administration
Trachtenberg School of Public Policy & Public Administration alumni
Living people
MIT Sloan Fellows
MIT Sloan School of Management alumni
People from Los Angeles
Military personnel from Tucson, Arizona
People from Vienna, Virginia
Recipients of the Coast Guard Distinguished Service Medal
Recipients of the Defense Distinguished Service Medal
Recipients of the Homeland Security Distinguished Service Medal
Recipients of the Legion of Merit
United States Coast Guard Academy alumni
United States Coast Guard admirals
United States Department of Homeland Security officials
Recipients of the Meritorious Service Medal (United States)